Vallois is a French commune.

Vallois may also refer to:

Henri Victor Vallois (1889–1981), French anthropologist and paleontologist
Philippe Vallois (born 1948), French film director and screenwriter
Dommartin-lès-Vallois, French commune
Les Vallois, French commune
Sans-Vallois, French commune
Galerie Vallois, French art gallery